The Federal Security Force (FSF) was a paramilitary/secret police force created by Zulfiqar Ali Bhutto, while he was the President  of Pakistan. Established in 1972, created as a civil task force of the federal government, this was used as a substitute to the use of army personnel in day to day issues of civilian life, ostensibly to assist the civil administration and the police in the maintenance of law and order without requiring the intervention of the military. 

The FSF was disbanded by General Zia-ul Haq after he, in 1977, overthrew the Bhutto government in a military coup de etat.

References

Political history of Pakistan
History of Pakistan
Government of Zulfikar Ali Bhutto
1972 establishments in Pakistan
1977 disestablishments in Pakistan
Former paramilitary forces of Pakistan
Defunct government departments and agencies of Pakistan
Government agencies established in 1972
Government agencies disestablished in 1977